Jaroslav Malátek (13 March 1923 in Choceň – 12 December 2014 in Ústí nad Orlicí) was a Czech painter. He was a prominent representative of Czech painting from the turn of the century, a legacy of French cubism, reaching to the Renaissance in the 15th and 16th century, when painters attempted to capture the fascinating element of graphical representation, i.e. space, the third dimension, and depth. In his work, the three-dimensionality of objects was replaced by the non-perspective of spaciousness, containing a meaning. This led to the discovery of a new art called “Spatial Metaphors“.

Life 
Jaroslav Malátek was born on 13 March 1923 in Choceň in an old mill. He graduated from Česká Třebová high school, where he was directed towards painting by Professor Bělský, who instructed him in painting. During his studies, he was also interested in athletics. His sport achievements eventually led him to Prague. There he had the opportunity to visit various galleries and encounter the works of famous painters after his sport meetings. A few years after his studies, he and many of his peers were forcibly recruited into the army and sent to Germany. His survival in Nürnberg during the war was a miracle, especially the mayhem, full of the sounds of sirens before the airstrikes by the allied units of the United States Air Force (USAF) and the Royal Air Force (RAF) between 1940 and 1945, when Nürnberg was almost destroyed, plagues his dreams until today.

After WWII he successfully graduated from the College of Education at Charles University in Prague (1945-1949). He studied under Professor Martin Salcman, Professor Karel Lidický and Professor Cyril Bouda, who successfully instructed him in the technique and art of the master painter Max Švabinský.

During the 1950's, the time of communist oppression, Jaroslav Malátek had to stop pursuing his career as a teacher. He focused even more on painting. He drew much of his inspiration from sceneries, which eventually became his inspiration for life. The View of Homol, Scenery in Zámrsk, From Javornice to the Mountains (an area that the painter Vojtěch Sedláček was from), Choceň by Lhoty, Běstovice Scenery – those are only some of his most prominent sceneries. Because during communism having an income from painting was only possible for a select few, Jaroslav Malátek had to work as a glass worker, building painter, miner and a logistics worker. He liked working in advertising and sometimes worked in interior design. In 1980, he moved from Choceň to Brandýs nad Orlicí. There, he met his girlfriend, Helena, who gave him further inspiration. During that time, he moved away from his scenic compositions to abstract paintings and pictures. This led to the creation of three-dimensional pictures utilizing materials such as fiberboard, metal and glass. All three-dimensional pictures were first created as small drafts and maquettes. These were subsequently magnified using different computer programs, and then fashioned in their intended size. The three-dimensional pictures, "Spatial Metaphors” by Jaroslav Malátek are intended to accent modern housing. They decorate the spaces of several European institutions. Due to their uniqueness, they have lately become sought after by successful individuals from Europe and Asia, mainly as a means of investment. The pictures can be seen at the author's exhibitions and potentially at auctions.

Pictures - Spatial Metaphors

Exhibitions (selection) 

 Art Gallery, Náchod
 Journey to three-dimensional pictures, Municipal library, Letohrad
 Gallery Glass Cube, Pardubice
 Journey to three-dimensional pictures 1968 - 2002, Town Hall Gallery, Ústí nad Orlicí
 Ghetto Museum, Terezín
 Cultural Center Svět Gallery, Mladá Boleslav
 Czechoslovakian Chamber Sculpture, Exhibition Hall Mánes, Praha
 Movie Art Competition, Zürich, Switzerland
 International competition, Jena, Gramny
 International competition in Kobe, Japan
 International painting competition, Osaka, Japan
 International competition, Jena, Germany
 International competition, Erfurt, Germany
 International competition, Budapest, Hungary
 International competition, Wien, Austria

Literature 
 Spatial Metaphors. 25 years of three-dimensional pictures, catalogue
 Richter M.: Spatial metaphors by Jaroslav Malátek, Echoes of Ústí, pages 12–13, March 2004
 Hudeček Ivan: Stories and opinions in three-dimensional pictures J. M., Lilie – Litomyšl Courier
 Richter Milan: Three-dimensional pictures are full of poetry, Orlické newspaper issue 49, 27. 2. 2004
 PhDr. Kmošek Petr: Spatial metaphors in three-dimensional pictures by Jaroslav Malátek, 
 Janďourková Helena: Picture exhibition in the Hamzově hospital in Luže, Chrudimsko newspaper issue 221. year 12, 20. 9. 2003
 Soukup Jiří: Jubilee celebration for two at the town hall, Hradecké newspaper issue 82, year 12, 7. 4. 2003
 HaJ: He was part of the vanguard, National Liberation issue 13, 19. 6. 2003
 MR: Jaroslav Malátek and Pavel Hlavatý – jubilee celebrations 2003, Echoes of Ústí, page 11, May 2003
 Richter Milan: Artists of the lower Orlicko area - Jaroslav Malátek, pages 187-195, Oftis, Ústí nad Labem
 H. J.: About the meaning, value and the loss of life, National Liberation, issues 25 - 26, 7. 12. 2000
 Janďourková Helena: Spatial Metaphors by J. M. exhibited at the Terezín memorial, surprise with their colorfulness, Litomeřice 
 J. M. cannot imagine art without the always present phenomenon seeking new things, Orlické newspaper 16. 3. 2001
 Kmošek Petr: Three-dimensional pictures by Jaroslav Malátek, 
 The Eastern-Bohemian painter, Studio, issue 17, page 5

1923 births
2014 deaths
Czech painters
Czech male painters
Czechoslovak painters
Charles University alumni